Sarge Frye Field was a baseball stadium in Columbia, South Carolina and served as home field of the University of South Carolina Gamecock baseball team until the 2008 season. The stadium held 6,000 people and was named after a longtime grounds keeper of the school's athletic fields. On February 21, 2009, USC began playing at the new Carolina Stadium. The last game at Sarge Frye was played on May 17, 2008. The field was named after Weldon B. "Sarge" Frye on May 11, 1980. It was demolished in 2010.

References

Defunct college baseball venues in the United States
South Carolina Gamecocks sports venues
Baseball venues in South Carolina
South Carolina Gamecocks baseball
Defunct sports venues in South Carolina
Sports venues demolished in 2010
Sports venues completed in 1977
1977 establishments in South Carolina
2010 disestablishments in South Carolina